Lieutenant General Sukhdeep Sangwan AVSM, SM & bar is a former General Officer of the Indian Army. He last served as the 20th Director General of the Assam Rifles. He was appointed to the position on May 14, 2018. He supernuated on 31 May 2021.

Early life and education 
He is an alumnus of Officers Training Academy(OTA), Chennai.
Sangwan graduated from the Defence Services Staff College in Wellington Cantonment. He also passed the National Defence College in Delhi.

Career
Sangwan was commissioned into the 12th Battalion The Rajputana Rifles in 1982 and has served in various commands and instructional assignments. He has commanded a Battalion, a Brigade, and a Division along the Line of Actual Control on the Northern Frontiers in the High Altitude Area and has also served in the counter-insurgency operations in Punjab, Jammu & Kashmir, Assam, and Nagaland.

Sangwan has experience in leadership, HR, and strategic affairs. He handled the functioning of the Tri-Services Training Institutes, namely National Defence Academy, Defence Services Staff College, Military Institute of Technology, and College of Defence Management over the Training & Doctrine (TRADOC) branch of HQ IDS in New Delhi.

Awards and decoration

Lt. Gen. Sangwan was awarded the Sena Medal in 2012, awarded a bar to the Sena Medal in 2018,  and also awarded the Ati Vishisht Seva Medal in 2020.

Personal life
He wrote a book entitled “Integrated Force Projection by India” and co-authored “Comprehensive National Power.”

Reference 

Indian generals
Assamese people
Year of birth missing (living people)
Living people
National Defence College, India alumni
College of Defence Management alumni
Defence Services Staff College alumni